In enzymology, a vitexin beta-glucosyltransferase is an enzyme that catalyzes the chemical reaction

UDP-glucose + vitexin  UDP + vitexin 2"-O-beta-D-glucoside

Thus, the two substrates of this enzyme are UDP-glucose and vitexin, whereas its two products are UDP and vitexin 2"-O-beta-D-glucoside.

This enzyme belongs to the family of glycosyltransferases, specifically the hexosyltransferases.  The systematic name of this enzyme class is UDP-glucose:vitexin 2. This enzyme is also called uridine diphosphoglucose-vitexin 2"-glucosyltransferase.

References

 

EC 2.4.1
Enzymes of unknown structure